Botherel is a surname. Notable people with the surname include:

Jacques Botherel (born 1946), French racing cyclist
René-Jean de Botherel du Plessis (1745–1805), French counter-revolutionary